Frank William Bentley (9 October 1886 – 1958) was an English footballer who played in the Football League for Stoke City and Tottenham Hotspur.

Career
Bentley began his career at his local side Butt Lane, before joining Stoke in 1907. He was not considered a first team player by manager Horace Austerberry but he did play Bentley in the clubs FA Cup fixtures in 1907–08 where he scored against Gainsborough Trinity. He played just once in the League for Stoke against West Bromwich Albion on 14 March 1908. At the end of the season Stoke left the league after suffering financial meltdown and joined the club who replaced Stoke, Tottenham Hotspur. He played 41 matches for Spurs in three seasons at White Hart Lane. He went on to play for Brentford where he ended his playing career.

Career statistics
Source:

References

1886 births
1958 deaths
People from Kidsgrove
English footballers
English Football League players
Stoke City F.C. players
Tottenham Hotspur F.C. players
Brentford F.C. players
Southern Football League players
Association football wing halves